William Smalley may refer to:

 Bill Smalley (1864–1912), English footballer
 William Smalley (pioneer) (1759/1760–1840), Ohio settler
 William A. Smalley (1923–1997), American linguist
 William E. Smalley, American Episcopal bishop
 Will Smalley (1871–1891), American baseball player